Guillaume Ducat (born 25 May 1996) is a French rugby union player. His position is Lock and he currently plays for Pau in the Top 14.

References

External links 
 

1996 births
Sportspeople from Tarbes
Living people
French rugby union players
Aviron Bayonnais players
France international rugby union players
Rugby union locks